Bob Cooper is an American freelance journalist and travel and general-interest writer. He is a former contributing editor for Runner's World, a former executive editor of Running Times, a competitive long distance runner, and a longtime San Francisco Bay Area resident.  He held various editorial positions for Triathlete, Inside Triathlon, and City Sports magazines.

Running and racing
Cooper has run several ultramarathons and marathons. As a teenager, he was part of a cross country relay run that traversed the length of the United States from the Pacific Ocean to the Atlantic Ocean in 19+ days.

Journalism career

In 1973, Runner's World published Cooper's first national magazine article. Cooper continued to write for Runner's World after the magazine was sold to Rodale, Inc. in Emmaus, Pennsylvania. His articles have appeared regularly in magazines including Men's Journal, Men's Fitness, National Geographic Adventure, National Geographic Traveler, Wired, and dozens of others.

After serving as an executive editor for Running Times, Cooper became a full-time freelance writer while continuing to work as a regular contributor to Runner's World.

References

External links
 

Living people
American male journalists
American male ultramarathon runners
Year of birth missing (living people)